Live is the first live album by Canadian hard rock band Mahogany Rush, originally released by Columbia  Records on March, 1978.

The album was originally released on the LP format. Later reissues of the album on the compact disc format have been expanded with bonus tracks.

Track listing 
All songs by Frank Marino, except where noted.

Side A
"Introduction" – 0:28
"The Answer" – 5:01
"Dragonfly" – 5:27
"I'm A King Bee" (Slim Harpo) - 5:57
"(Excerpt from 'Back Door Man')" (Willie Dixon) – 2:56
"A New Rock & Roll" – 4:19

Side B
"Johnny B. Goode" (Chuck Berry) - 5:16
"Talkin' 'Bout a Feelin'" - 3:58
"(Excerpt from 'Who Do Ya Love')" (Bo Diddley) - 1:32
"Electric Reflections of War" - 3:04
"The World Anthem" - 3:39
"Purple Haze" (Jimi Hendrix) - 4:01

Bonus tracks on Expanded Edition
Bonus tracks are recorded at California Jam II.
"I'm A King Bee" (Slim Harpo) - 6:43
"Johnny B. Goode" (Chuck Berry) - 8:19

Charts

Personnel
Frank Marino - vocals, guitar, producer
Jim Aoyub ("Jimbo") - drums and percussions
Paul del. Harwood - bass

References

External links 
 
 Mahogany Rush Albums at mahoganyrush.com

1978 live albums
Mahogany Rush albums
Columbia Records live albums